Philip (died 318 BC) was satrap of Sogdiana. He was first appointed to this position by Alexander the Great in 327 BC. He retained his post, as did most of the satraps of the more remote provinces, in the arrangements which followed the death of the king in 323 BC; but in the subsequent partition at Triparadisus in 321 BC, he was assigned the government of Parthia instead. Here he remained until 318 BC, when Peithon, who was then seeking to establish his power over all the provinces of the East, made himself master of Parthia, and put Philip to death.

References
Smith, William (editor); Dictionary of Greek and Roman Biography and Mythology, "Philippus (9)", Boston, (1867)

Notes

318 BC deaths
Ancient Macedonian generals
Satraps of the Alexandrian Empire
Year of birth unknown